The Einkorn is a 510 metre high hill spur in the northern Limpurg Hills near Hessental in the borough of Schwäbisch Hall. It has the ruins of a baroque pilgrimage church that was dedicated to the Fourteen Holy Helpers. The hill is located in the German state of Baden-Württemberg.

Mountains and hills of Baden-Württemberg
Limpurg Hills